Xinghua Sui Ethnic Township is a township of southern Rongjiang County in southeastern Guizhou province, China, located about  southwest of the county seat at an elevation of , which is low-lying for Guizhou's standards. , it has nine villages under its administration.

References 

Township-level divisions of Qiandongnan Miao and Dong Autonomous Prefecture